Juan Bautista Cambiaso (BE-01) is a training ship for the Dominican Navy. Launched in 2009, it is a three-masted barquentine (schooner barque) with a hull made of steel and a teak-covered deck. It is named after Genoese-born Dominican Admiral Juan Bautista Cambiaso, who founded the Dominican Navy in 1844.

History

Juan Bautista Cambiaso was launched on 29 August 2009 in Varna, Bulgaria. The ship — originally named Royal Helena— was acquired by the Dominican Navy in August 2018 and named in honor of Admiral Juan Bautista Cambiaso, founder of the Dominican Navy, who defeated the Haitian navy in the Battle of Tortuguero. During this engagement, a force of three Dominican schooners led by then-Commander Juan Bautista Cambiaso (at the helm of the flagship schooner Separación Dominicana) defeated a force of three warships of the Haitian Navy, ensuring naval supremacy for the newborn nation.

The ship replaces an earlier training ship of the same name, acquired from the Canadian Navy in 1947. That ship, a motor-ship of the corvette class, had previously been named HMCS Belleville. It was scrapped by the Dominican Navy in 1972.

Description
Juan Bautista Cambiaso is a barquentine. Her callsign is LZKZ and she is identified by the MMSI number 207369000.

Accidents 
On 20 June 2017 she struck another vessel, the Victoria, while entering the port of Oudeschild, Netherlands. There were no reports of injured people.

External links 
 Dominican Navy Official website: Armada de República Dominicana incorpora a su flota naval el buque escuela (Dominican Navy incorporates training ship into its Navy) 
 Naval News: The Dominican Republic commissioned its new training tall ship  
 La Armada Dominicana ya tiene su propio buque escuela 
 Naval News: The Dominican Republic commissioned its new training tall ship 
 Sail Training International profile of ARD Juan Bautista Cambiaso 
 View to shipyard (Royal Helena in progress) at MTG Dolphin in Varna/Bulgaria

References

Ships of the Dominican Navy
Tall ships of the Dominican Republic
Training ships
Barquentines
Ships built in Bulgaria
Three-masted ships
2009 ships